Punta La Marmora is a mountain in the Gennargentu range, Sardinia (Italy).

Geography 
The mountain belongs to Ogliastra and Nuoro provinces, in the Barbagia mountain area of inner Sardinia. With its summit at an elevation of 1,834 m, it is the highest peak on the island. Dedicated to the Piedmontese geographer Alberto Ferrero della Marmora, it is included in the communal territories of Desulo and Arzana.

Punta La Marmora is situated just east of the approximate center of Sardinia and the summit offers good views of the entire island. On a clear day most of the coastline and all the surrounding peaks are visible.

See also
 List of European ultra prominent peaks
 List of Italian regions by highest point

References

External links 
 Peakbagger

One-thousanders of Italy
Mountains of Sardinia
Highest points of Italian regions